The Ediacaran Period is a geological period that spans 96 million years from the end of the Cryogenian Period 635 million years ago (Mya), to the beginning of the Cambrian Period 538.8 Mya. It marks the end of the  Proterozoic Eon, and the beginning of the Phanerozoic Eon. It is named after the Ediacara Hills of South Australia.

The Ediacaran Period's status as an official geological period was ratified in 2004 by the International Union of Geological Sciences (IUGS), making it the first new geological period declared in 120 years.

The Ediacaran marks the first appearance of widespread multicellular fauna following the end of Snowball Earth glaciation events, the so-called Ediacaran biota, which is represented by now-extinct relatively simple animal phyla such as Proarticulata (bilaterians with articulation including Dickinsonia and Spriggina), Petalonamae (sea pen-like animals including Charnia), Disc-shaped forms (radial-shaped animals including Cyclomedusa) and Trilobozoa (animals with tri-radial symmetry including Tribrachidium). Most of those organisms appeared during or after the Avalon explosion event 575 million years ago and died out during an End-Ediacaran extinction event 539 million years ago. Some modern groups of animals also appeared during this period, including cnidarians and early bilaterians such as Xenacoelomorpha. Mollusc-like Kimberella also lived during the Ediacaran. Fossilized organisms with shells or skeletons were yet to evolve in the Cambrian, the superseding period of the Phanerozoic eon.

The supercontinent Pannotia formed and broke apart by the end of the period. The Ediacaran also witnessed several glaciation events, such as the Gaskiers and Baykonurian glaciations. The Shuram excursion also occurred during this period, but its glacial origin is unlikely.

Ediacaran and Vendian

The Ediacaran Period overlaps but is shorter than the Vendian Period, a name that was earlier, in 1952, proposed by Russian geologist and paleontologist Boris Sokolov. The Vendian concept was formed stratigraphically top-down, and the lower boundary of the Cambrian became the upper boundary of the Vendian.

Paleontological substantiation of this boundary was worked out separately for the siliciclastic basin (base of the Baltic Stage of the Eastern European Platform) and for the carbonate basin (base of the Tommotian stage of the Siberian Platform).
The lower boundary of the Vendian was suggested to be defined at the base of the Varanger (Laplandian) tillites.

The Vendian in its type area consists of large subdivisions such as Laplandian, Redkino, Kotlin and Rovno regional stages with the globally traceable subdivisions and their boundaries, including its lower one.

The Redkino, Kotlin and Rovno regional stages have been substantiated in the type area of the Vendian on the basis of the abundant organic-walled microfossils, megascopic algae, metazoan body fossils and ichnofossils.

The lower boundary of the Vendian could have a biostratigraphic substantiation as well taking into consideration the worldwide occurrence of the Pertatataka assemblage of giant acanthomorph acritarchs.

Upper and lower boundaries

The Ediacaran Period (c. 635–538.8 Mya) represents the time from the end of global Marinoan glaciation to the first appearance worldwide of somewhat complicated trace fossils (Treptichnus pedum (Seilacher, 1955)).

Although the Ediacaran Period does contain soft-bodied fossils, it is unusual in comparison to later periods because its beginning is not defined by a change in the fossil record. Rather, the beginning is defined at the base of a chemically distinctive carbonate layer that is referred to as a "cap carbonate", because it caps glacial deposits.

This bed is characterized by an unusual depletion of 13C that indicates a sudden climatic change at the end of the Marinoan ice age. The lower global boundary stratotype section (GSSP) of the Ediacaran is at the base of the cap carbonate (Nuccaleena Formation), immediately above the Elatina diamictite in the Enorama Creek section, Brachina Gorge, Flinders Ranges, South Australia.

The GSSP of the upper boundary of the Ediacaran is the lower boundary of the Cambrian on the SE coast of Newfoundland approved by the International Commission on Stratigraphy as a preferred alternative to the base of the Tommotian Stage in Siberia which was selected on the basis of the ichnofossil Treptichnus pedum (Seilacher, 1955). In the history of stratigraphy it was the first case of usage of bioturbations for the System boundary definition.

Nevertheless, the definitions of the lower and upper boundaries of the Ediacaran on the basis of chemostratigraphy and ichnofossils are disputable.

Cap carbonates generally have a restricted geographic distribution (due to specific conditions of their precipitation) and usually siliciclastic sediments laterally replace the cap carbonates in a rather short distance but cap carbonates do not occur above every tillite elsewhere in the world.

The C-isotope chemostratigraphic characteristics obtained for contemporaneous cap carbonates in different parts of the world may be variable in a wide range owing to different degrees of secondary alteration of carbonates, dissimilar criteria used for selection of the least altered samples, and, as far as the C-isotope data are concerned, due to primary lateral variations of δ l3Ccarb in the upper layer of the ocean.

Furthermore, Oman presents in its stratigraphic record a large negative carbon isotope excursion, within the Shuram Formation that is clearly away from any glacial evidence strongly questioning systematic association of negative δ l3Ccarb excursion and glacial events. Also, the Shuram excursion is prolonged and is estimated to last for ~9.0 Myrs.

As to the Treptichnus pedum, a reference ichnofossil for the lower boundary of the Cambrian, its usage for the stratigraphic detection of this boundary is always risky, because of the occurrence of very similar trace fossils belonging to the Treptichnids group well below the level of T. pedum in Namibia, Spain and Newfoundland, and possibly, in the western United States. The stratigraphic range of T. pedum overlaps the range of the Ediacaran fossils in Namibia, and probably in Spain.

Subdivisions 

Absolute dating
The dating of the rock type section of the Ediacaran Period in South Australia has proven uncertain due to lack of overlying igneous material. Therefore, the age range of 635 to 538.8 million years is based on correlations to other countries where dating has been possible. The base age of approximately 635 million years is based on U–Pb (uranium–lead) and Re–Os (rhenium–osmium) dating from Africa, China, North America, and Tasmania.

Biota 

The fossil record from the Ediacaran Period is sparse, as more easily fossilized hard-shelled animals had yet to evolve. The Ediacaran biota include the oldest definite multicellular organisms (with specialized tissues), the most common types of which resemble segmented worms, fronds, disks, or immobile bags. Auroralumina was a cnidarian.

Most members of the Ediacaran biota bear little resemblance to modern lifeforms, and their relationship even with the immediately following lifeforms of the Cambrian explosion is rather difficult to interpret. More than 100 genera have been described, and well known forms include Arkarua, Charnia, Dickinsonia, Ediacaria, Marywadea, Cephalonega, Pteridinium, and Yorgia. However, despite the overall enigmaticness of most Ediacaran organisms, some fossils identifiable as hard-shelled agglutinated foraminifera (which are not classified as animals) are known from latest Ediacaran sediments of western Siberia.

Four different biotic intervals are known in the Ediacaran, each being characterised by the prominence of a unique ecology and faunal assemblage. The first spanned from 635 to around 575 Ma and was dominated by acritarchs known as large ornamented Ediacaran microfossils. The second spanned from around 575 to 560 Ma and was characterised by the Avalon biota. The third spanned from 560 to 550 Ma; its biota has been dubbed the White Sea biota due to many fossils from this time being found along the coasts of the White Sea. The fourth lasted from 550 to 539 Ma and is known as the interval of the Nama biotic assemblage.

There is evidence for a mass extinction during this period from early animals changing the environment, dating to the same time as the transition between the White Sea and the Nama-type biotas. Alternatively, this mass extinction has also been theorised to have been the result of an anoxic event.

Astronomical factors 
The relative proximity of the Moon at this time meant that tides were stronger and more rapid than they are now. The day was 21.9 ± 0.4 hours, and there were 13.1 ± 0.1 synodic months/year and 400 ± 7 solar days/year.

Documentaries 
A few English language documentaries have featured the Ediacaran Period and biota:
 The Time Traveller's Guide To Australia (2012, ABC Science; Part 1 of 4).
 The Geological History of Canada, as part of The Nature of Things series, CBC-SRC; 2011; Eastern Canada.
 The first episode of a BBC documentary titled Life on Earth, with David Attenborough as narrator.
 Another documentary narrated by David Attenborough titled First Life featuring Charnia, Dickinsonia, Spriggina, Funisia, and Kimberella animated in CGI.
 In our time - Ediacara Biota, BBC, 9 July 2009

See also
  (with link directory)
 Avalon explosion
 End-Ediacaran extinction

References

External links

 
 
 Introduction to the Vendian Period
 Introduction to the Ediacaran Fauna
 transcript – Catalyst (Australian Broadcasting Corporation)
 Mistaken Point Fauna: The Discovery
 Earth's oldest animal ecosystem held in fossils at Nilpena Station in SA outback ABC News, 5 August 2013. Accessed 6 August 2013.

 
03
Geological periods
Proterozoic geochronology